Euphaedra alacris is a butterfly in the family Nymphalidae. It is found from Cameroon to the Democratic Republic of the Congo and in Uganda and western Tanzania. The habitat consists of dense forests.

The larvae possibly feed on Sapindaceae species.

Gallery

References

Butterflies described in 1978
alacris